Riley Anderson Stewart (March 14, 1919 – December 10, 2000) was an American Negro league pitcher in the 1940s.

A native of Benton, Louisiana, Stewart served in the United States Army during World War II. He began his Negro league career in 1946 with the Chicago American Giants, and also played for the Memphis Red Sox.

After his playing career, Stewart was a teacher and coach in Shreveport, Louisiana. Stewart and major league slugger and Shreveport native Albert Belle were responsible for renovating Shreveport's historic SPAR Stadium, which was then renamed "Galilee's Stewart–Belle Stadium". Stewart died in Shreveport in 2000 at age 81.

References

External links
 and Seamheads

1919 births
2000 deaths
Chicago American Giants players
Memphis Red Sox players
People from Benton, Louisiana
Baseball players from Louisiana
Baseball pitchers
United States Army personnel of World War II
20th-century African-American sportspeople